Erik Must (born 26 January 1943) is a Norwegian stock broker and investor. He was born in Trondheim, a son of banker Arne Bernhoft Must and Svanhild Synnøve Svendsen. He established the investment company Avanse Forvaltning along with Kjell Christian Ulrichsen, and later became owner of Fondsfinans. He is a significant investor in Norwegian media companies, controlling large parts of the publishing house Gyldendal Norsk Forlag, as well as the newspapers Dagens Næringsliv and Adresseavisen. He is also a significant owner of the energy company Arendals Fossekompani.

Forbes lists his net worth as of April 2022 at $1.1 billion USD.

References 

1943 births
Living people
People from Trondheim
Norwegian company founders
Norwegian billionaires